The 1927 Ottawa Senators finished in 2nd place in the Interprovincial Rugby Football Union with a 3–2–1 record, but failed to qualify for the playoffs and defend their Grey Cup title.

Regular season

Standings

Schedule

References

Ottawa Rough Riders seasons